Kim Choon-ho (born 2 September 1960) is a former professional tennis player from South Korea.

Biography
Kim featured in eight Davis Cup ties for South Korea, including a World Group playoff against Italy in 1981, registering a five-set win over Corrado Barazzutti.

At the 1982 Asian Games he won three medals, a gold in both the men's and mixed doubles, as well as a silver in the singles.

He is a former non-playing captain of the South Korea Davis Cup team.

See also
List of South Korea Davis Cup team representatives

References

External links
 
 
 

1960 births
Living people
South Korean male tennis players
Tennis coaches
Tennis players at the 1982 Asian Games
Medalists at the 1982 Asian Games
Asian Games medalists in tennis
Asian Games gold medalists for South Korea
Asian Games silver medalists for South Korea
People from Namwon
Sportspeople from North Jeolla Province
20th-century South Korean people
21st-century South Korean people